DJK Agon 08 Düsseldorf is a German football and sports club from Düsseldorf.

Its women's basketball section dominated the Bundesliga through the 1980s winning eleven championships between 1980 and 1991, and reached the final of the European Cup in 1983 and 1986 under the guidance of coach Tony DiLeo. Agon Düsseldorf also has athletics, badminton, handball, tennis, table tennis and volleyball teams. The men's football squad plays in Kreisliga A (VIII).

Titles
 Women's basketball
 Bundesliga
 1975, 1980, 1981, 1982, 1983, 1984, 1985, 1986, 1987, 1988, 1990, 1991
 German Basketball Cup
 1980, 1981, 1983, 1984, 1985, 1986, 1988
 Football
 Kreisliga A (VIII)
 2010
 Kreisliga B (VIII)
 2006

References

External links
 Official website

Women's basketball teams in Germany
Sport in Düsseldorf
German Youth Power Sports Association
Multi-sport clubs in Germany
1908 establishments in Germany
Association football clubs established in 1908
Sports clubs established in 1908
Football clubs in North Rhine-Westphalia
Dusseldorf Agon